The Demarest House (also known as the George H. Cook House, the Doolittle house and Riverstede) is a historic building at 542 George Street in New Brunswick, New Jersey on the campus of Rutgers University. It was documented by the Historic American Buildings Survey in 1960. The house was later added to the National Register of Historic Places on August 10, 1977 for its significance in architecture, education, and social history.

History
The house was built by George H. Cook and architect Charles Graham in 1868.  The two and one-half story ashlar brownstone building features Victorian Gothic architecture. Cook lived here until his death in 1889. William H. S. Demarest, president of Rutgers College and later president of the New Brunswick Theological Seminary, lived here from 1906 until his death in 1956. Since then the building has served a variety of purposes at Rutgers University. As of 2022 it houses various offices for the Rutgers School of Social Work.

See also
 National Register of Historic Places listings in Middlesex County, New Jersey

References

External links
 
 

		
National Register of Historic Places in Middlesex County, New Jersey
University and college buildings on the National Register of Historic Places in New Jersey
New Jersey Register of Historic Places
Historic American Buildings Survey in New Jersey
Gothic Revival architecture in New Jersey
Stone houses in New Jersey
Rutgers University buildings
Buildings and structures in New Brunswick, New Jersey